Coelorinchus kishinouyei, the Mugura grenadier, is a species of rattail that occurs in the waters around Japan and Taiwan where it is found at depths of .  This species grows to a length of  TL and is of minor importance to local commercial fisheries.

The species name is a tribute to Japanese fisheries biologist Kamakichi Kishinouye (岸上 鎌吉, 1867–1929).

References

External links

 Picture on fishpix.kahaku.go.jp

Macrouridae
Fish described in 1900
Taxa named by David Starr Jordan